Durrington may refer to:

Places in England
Durrington, West Sussex, a suburb of Worthing
Durrington-on-Sea railway station
RAF Durrington, World War II radar station
Durrington, Wiltshire, a village and parish 
Durrington Walls, a prehistoric henge monument

Other uses
Durrington grass, a grass, also known as Axonopus fissifolius
Durrington Windmill, post mill in High Salvington, Sussex, England